Kate Cullity is an Australian landscape architect and founding director of TCL (Taylor Cullity Lethlean), a landscape architecture and urban design practice based in Melbourne and Adelaide, Australia.

Early life 
Kate Cullity grew up in Perth, Western Australia. She received a Bachelor of Science, majoring in Botany, from the University of Western Australia in 1977, and later a Diploma of Education, also from the University of Western Australia, in 1979.

Career 
Her career began as a biology high school teacher before she moved from Perth to Melbourne in 1982 and commenced studying for a Master of Landscape Architecture at the University of Melbourne in 1985. In 1986 she worked for the then Victorian Public Works Department in the landscape architecture division. From 1987-1989 she designed and constructed residential gardens. In 1989 she met Kevin Taylor while working in the offices of architect Gregory Burgess.

In 1990 Cullity and Taylor founded their landscape architecture practice Kevin Taylor and Kate Cullity Pty Ltd, later renamed to Taylor and Cullity. Their first major project was the Box Hill Community Arts Centre in Melbourne’s eastern suburbs. In 1995 Cullity and Taylor relocated to Adelaide, maintaining a Melbourne studio headed by Perry Lethlean, who later became the company’s third director. The company developed into one of Australia’s most well-known and awarded landscape architecture firms, employing around thirty landscape architects across its Adelaide and Melbourne studios. The company has received many awards and international notoriety with the design of the Australian Garden in Cranbourne, Victoria.

Kate Cullity is particularly respected for her private garden designs in Australia and culturally-interpretive exhibits at garden festivals in France, Canada and Germany.
 
Cullity completed a practice-based PhD from RMIT University in 2013.
 
In 2014 she became an Adjunct Associate Professor at the University of Adelaide and a Fellow of the Australian Institute of Landscape Architects in 2016.

Notable projects 
 Cultivated by Fire, IGA International Garden Festival, Berlin, Germany, 2017
 Redevelopment of Victoria Square, Adelaide, 2012
 Adelaide Airport Plaza, Adelaide, 2012
 Seeing the Woods for the Trees, University of NSW, 2007
 The Australian Garden, Cranbourne, Victoria, 2006
 Eucalyptus Light and Shadow, Metis International Garden Festival, 2005
 Fire Stories, Chaumont – sur- Loire Garden Festival, France, 2004
 Taylor and Cullity Garden, Adelaide, 2003
 Redevelopment of North Terrace, Adelaide,  2002
 Uluru Kata Tjuta Aboriginal Cultural Centre, 1993
 Box Hill Community Arts Centre, 1990

Further reading 
Books
 Lee, G. and Ware, S. (2014) Taylor Cullity Lethlean: Making Sense of Landscape, Spacemaker Press.
 Metis International Garden Festival and Waugh, E. (2016) Experimenting Landscapes: Testing the Limits of the Garden, Birkhäuserds.
 Zeunert, J. (2017) Landscape Architecture and Environmental Sustainability: Creating Positive Change Through Design, Bloomsbury Academic.
Articles
 Kate Cullity on abstracted landscapes and the ‘distillation’ of place, Architecture & Design
 The ten most significant works of Australian landscape architecture 2001–2017, Landscape Australia
 Kate Cullity: Maker’s mark, ArchitectureAU
 IN PROFILE: TCL's Kate Cullity, landscape architecture and environmental art, Architecture & Design
 The Australian Garden, Landezine
 Taylor Cullity Lethlean: Victoria Square/Tarndanyangga, ArchitectureAU

References

External links 
 T.C.L

Australian landscape architects
Australian women architects
Women landscape architects
Living people
Architects from Melbourne
Year of birth missing (living people)
Architects from Adelaide